Kerry Freedman is Professor of Art and Design Education at Northern Illinois University and Coordinator of Doctoral Programs in the College of Visual and Performing Arts. She is also a past Head of the Art + Design Education Division. Professor Freedman's research focuses on questions concerning the relationship of curriculum to art, culture, and technology.  Recently, she has particularly focused on inquiries into student learning through engagement with visual culture. She has provided significant leadership to the field through her various service roles and publications. Freedman's service roles include, but are not limited to: Senior Editor of Studies in Art Education, the research journal of the National Art Education Association, and World Councilor of the International Society for Education through Art, a UNESCO affiliate. She was the co-Chair of the Art Education Research Institute.

Freedman is an active researcher with over 100 published articles and book chapters and her work has been translated into multiple languages. Freedman has done over 200 national and international presentations.  She has been a Fulbright Scholar and Visiting Professor at several universities, including Harvard University, Cambridge University, University of Melbourne, University of Barcelona, and University of Sao Paulo.

The art education paradigm shift to VCAE (Visual Culture Art Education) has been greatly influenced by her work. Freedman's book, Teaching Visual Culture, provided guidance in the transition from a narrow, discipline-based focus on fine art in education. Freedman argued that visual culture, including popular culture and fine art, is socially constructed and has become pervasive, shaping all aspects of public behavior and influencing conceptions of self.  She sought a response to these conditions from educators to prepare students for the promises and pitfalls of visual culture. Recently, Kerry Freedman was an editor for the curriculum volume of The International Encyclopedia of Art & Design Education, the first art and design education encyclopedia to be published.

Education 
Kerry Freedman obtained her Bachelor of Fine Arts and master's degrees in Art Education from the University of Illinois, Champaign-Urbana. Her Ph.D. in Curriculum and Instruction-Art Education with minors in Art (Computer Graphics), and Psychology was granted by the University of Wisconsin–Madison.

Career 
After teaching K-12 art, Freedman's higher education career began as a professor at the University of Minnesota from 1985–2000. Currently, she is a professor of Art and Design Education at Northern Illinois University. While at Northern Illinois University, Freedman was elected as a Distinguished Fellow of the  National Art Education Association (NAEA) in 2000, received the 2006 NAEA Higher Art Educator of the year, and the 2014 Higher Art Educator of the Year by the Illinois Art Education Association (IAEA). She has also received the Leon Jackman Award (the Australian national award for distinguished research in art education), the Ziegfeld Award, the Manual Barkan Award (NAEA), the United States Society for Education through Art Award (2019) among others.

Freedman has worked in over twenty-five countries and has done over one hundred and fifty national and international presentations. She has also supported the arts through several PBS Kids publications that emphasized the importance of art in child development, self-expression, and developing connections.

Recent Examples of Publications

Books 
The International Encyclopedia of Art & Design Education
 by John Baldacchino (Editor), Kerry Freedman (Editor), Emese Hall (Editor), and Nigel Meager (Editor)

Teaching Visual Culture: Curriculum, Aesthetics, and the Social Life of Art
 by Kerry Freedman (Author)

Looking Back: Fifty Years of Studies in Art Education
 by Kerry Freedman (Editor)

Curriculum, Culture and Art Education: Comparative Perspective (Suny Series, Innovations in Curriculum)
 by Kerry Freedman (Editor), Fernando Hernandez (Series Editor)

Postmodern Art Education: An Approach to Curriculum
 by Patricia Stuhr (Author), A. Efland (Editor), Stuhr (Editor), Kerry Freedman (Editor)

Book Chapters 
Visual culture and visual literacy. The International Encyclopedia of Art and Design Education, Vol. 2 of 3 (Curriculum). 
 by Kerry Freedman

Social justice in art education: An example from Africa's last colony. The International Encyclopedia of Art and Design Education, Vol. 2 of 3 (Curriculum).
 by Perez-Martin, F., & Freedman, K.

Viewing comics as education through art. In D. Seelow (Ed.), Leaping tall buildings with comics: Pedagogy and practice.
 by Kerry Freedman

Interculturalism now: How visual culture has changed formal and informal learning. In P. Burnard, E. Mackinlay, & K. Powell (Eds.) The international handbook of intercultural arts research.
 by Kerry Freedman

Becoming a student of art: How institutional change can support contemporary practice. In K. Hatton (Ed.), Towards an inclusive arts education.
 by Kerry Freedman

Learning as a condition of creativity: The relationship between knowing and making art. In E. Zimmerman & F. Bastos (Eds.), Creativity in art education.
 by Kerry Freedman

Research as social action: The research process in art education. In K. Miraglia & C. Smilan (Eds.), Inquiry in action: Paradigms, methodologies and perspectives in art education research.
 by Kerry Freedman

The art of gaming: Knowledge construction in visual culture learning communities. In Venkatesh, V., Castro, J. C., Lewis, J. E., & Wallin, J. (Eds.), Educational, behavioral, and psychological considerations in niche online Communities.
 by Kerry Freedman

Social perspectives of art education in the US. In Bering, K., Niechoff, R. Pauls, K., & Hölscher, S. (Eds.), Visual learning: Positionen im internationalen Vergleich.
 by Kerry Freedman

Assessment of visual knowledge and communication in art education.  In A. Karpati & E. Gaul (Eds.), From child art to visual culture of youth.
 by Kerry Freedman

An aesthetic of horror in education: Schools as dystopian environments. In J. Heybach & E. Sheffield (Eds.), Dystopia and education.
 by Kerry Freedman

Articles 
The story of Vizcult: How a grassroots idea influenced art education.
 by Hicks, L. & Freedman, K.

Collaboration in visual culture learning communities: Towards a synergy of individual and collective creative practice,
 by Karpati, A., Freedman, K., Kallio-Tavin, M. Heijnen, E. & Castro, J. C.

Cultural literacies approach.
 by Kerry Freedman

Visual culture learning communities: How and what students come to know in informal art groups.
 by Freedman, K., Heijnen, E., Kallio-Tavin, M., Karpati, A., & Papp, L.

Leadership in art education: Taking action in schools and communities.
 by Kerry Freedman

Rethinking creativity: A definition to support contemporary practice.
 by Kerry Freedman

Art making/trouble making: Creativity, policy, and leadership in art education.
 by Kerry Freedman

References 

Living people
University of Illinois College of Education alumni
University of Wisconsin–Madison School of Education alumni
Date of birth missing (living people)
Northern Illinois University faculty
Year of birth missing (living people)